is a female long-distance runner from Japan. She competed in the Women's 5000 metres event at the 2015 World Championships in Athletics in Beijing, China.

See also
 Japan at the 2015 World Championships in Athletics

References

External links 
 
 

1996 births
Living people
Japanese female long-distance runners
World Athletics Championships athletes for Japan
Place of birth missing (living people)
20th-century Japanese women
21st-century Japanese women